Moonchild is an American alternative R&B band based in Los Angeles, California. The band consists of Amber Navran, Max Bryk, and Andris Mattson. All three are alumni of USC Thornton School of Music's Jazz Studies program. The band formed in the summer of 2011 after touring the west coast with Navran's previous solo project. The trio bonded in the car over similar music tastes and spent the summer and subsequent fall writing the music for what became their debut album Be Free, which would be released the following year. 

The debut album was well received by critics, garnering praise from many musical greats including Jill Scott, DJ Jazzy Jeff,  and Stevie Wonder. After hearing the group's music in December 2012, Wonder invited the group to open for him at his annual House Full of Toys benefit concert. 

Since the release of Be Free in 2012, the band has released three more albums through British record label Tru Thoughts and toured internationally. They have also collaborated on tracks with Rapsody and Tall Black Guy.

Moonchild performed an NPR Tiny Desk Concert in December 2019.

During the 2019 Little Ghost US Tour, the band used their platform to promote local charities in each city they played in.

Band members 

 Amber Navran — lead vocals, flute, tenor saxophone, synthesizer, piano, drums 
 Max Bryk - piano, synthesizer, alto saxophone, clarinet, kalimba, drums 
 Andris Mattson - piano, synthesizer, alto saxophone, acoustic guitar, ukulele, flugelhorn, drums

Discography

Albums

References

External links
 

Musical groups from Los Angeles
American contemporary R&B musical groups